Hubert Matuschek (3 November 1902 – 10 July 1968) was an Austrian architect. His work was part of the architecture event in the art competition at the 1936 Summer Olympics.

References

1902 births
1968 deaths
20th-century Austrian architects
Olympic competitors in art competitions
People from Budapest